Hajj Yadollah Mahalleh (also Romanized as Ḩājj Yadollāh Maḩalleh; also known as Ḩājj Yadollāh Maḩalleh-ye Chūbar and Ḩāj Yadollāh Maḩalleh-ye Chūbar) is a village in Chubar Rural District, Haviq District, Talesh County, Gilan Province, Iran. At the 2006 census, its population was 768, in 188 families.

References 

Populated places in Talesh County